Vratislav Hugo Brunner (15 October 1886 in Prague – 13 July 1928 in Horní Lomnice, Kunice) was a Czech typographer, illustrator, graphic designer, cartoonist, author, toy and stage designer and painter. He significantly affected the development of Czech book graphics.

See also
List of Czech painters

References

1886 births
1928 deaths
Czech illustrators
Czech graphic designers
Czech cartoonists
Czech typographers and type designers
20th-century Czech painters
Czech male painters
Artists from Prague
Burials at Olšany Cemetery
20th-century Czech male artists